Gilbert Young (born 1941) is an American artist from Cincinnati, specializing in conceptions of the African-American experience. Young is best known for his painting He Ain't Heavy, which as of 2004 had sold "nearly one million" copies. His art has been used by BellSouth advertising and on T-shirts worn by actors on Bill Cosby's NBC sitcom A Different World.

Young criticized the selection of Chinese sculptor Lei Yixin to sculpt the National Mall's Martin Luther King, Jr. Memorial. One of his objections was that the sculptor chosen should be African-American.

In 2019, Gilbert Young completed the longest mural in Atlanta, measuring 700 feet.

References

External links
 "He Ain't Heavy Foundation Lifetime Achievement Award, presented to Gilbert Young April 2013", YouTube.
 "Gilbert Young's Official Website"

African-American artists
1941 births
Artists from Cincinnati
Living people
21st-century African-American people
20th-century African-American people